1552 Bessel, provisional designation , is a stony Eoan asteroid from the outer regions of the asteroid belt, approximately 18 kilometers in diameter. It was discovered on 24 February 1938, by Finnish astronomer Yrjö Väisälä at Turku Observatory in Southwest Finland, and named after German astronomer Friedrich Bessel.

Orbit and classification 

Bessel is a stony asteroid and a member of the Eos family that orbits the Sun in the outer main-belt at a distance of 2.7–3.3 AU once every 5 years and 3 months (1,909 days). Its orbit has an eccentricity of 0.10 and an inclination of 10° with respect to the ecliptic.

Naming 

This minor planet was named after German astronomer Friedrich Wilhelm Bessel (1789–1846), who measured the first stellar parallax in 1838. His measured parallax of 0.314 arcseconds for 61 Cygni gave a distance of 10.3 light-years, which is 9.6% off today's measured distance of 11.4 light-years. Bessel is also honored by the lunar crater Bessel. The official  was published by the Minor Planet Center on 30 January 1964.

Physical characteristics

Rotation period and pole 

In March 2011, a rotational lightcurve of Bessel was obtained from photometric observations by Italian amateur astronomer Silvano Casulli. Lightcurve analysis gave a well-defined rotation period of 8.996 hours with a brightness variation of 0.29 magnitude.

In 2016, a modeled lightcurve using photometric data from various sources gave a concurring period of 8.96318 hours, as well as a spin axis of (61.0°, −50.0°) in ecliptic coordinates (λ, β).

Diameter and albedo 

According to the survey carried out by NASA's Wide-field Infrared Survey Explorer with its subsequent NEOWISE mission, Bessel measures between 16.63 and 18.817 kilometers in diameter, and its surface has an albedo between 0.1514 and 0.193. The Collaborative Asteroid Lightcurve Link derives an albedo of 0.1448 and a diameter of 18.33 kilometers with an absolute magnitude of 11.4.

Notes

References

External links 
 Asteroid Lightcurve Database (LCDB), query form (info )
 Dictionary of Minor Planet Names, Google books
 Asteroids and comets rotation curves, CdR – Observatoire de Genève, Raoul Behrend
 Discovery Circumstances: Numbered Minor Planets (1)-(5000) – Minor Planet Center
 
 

001552
Discoveries by Yrjö Väisälä
Named minor planets
19380224